The West Australian Rowing Club is a rowing club based in Perth, Western Australia. The club has operated out of a boatshed next to Barrack Square since 1906.

History
While the current club was incorporated in 1894, the club believes it has roots dating back to 1868. It was the first rowing club in Western Australia, and is the last one remaining on the Perth city foreshore.

The club opened a boatshed next to Barrack Square in March 1906. The boatshed received a permanent listing on the Western Australian Register of Heritage Places in 2001.

There was long standing rivalry with Swan River Rowing Club in the early years of the two organisations.

References

1868 establishments in Australia
Rowing clubs in Australia
Rowing in Western Australia
Clubs and societies in Western Australia
Sports clubs established in 1868